Catherine Dubois (born July 29, 1995) is a Canadian ice hockey forward,  signed with the Montreal Force of the Premier Hockey Federation (PHF). She was the first Montréal Carabins player to be invited to a senior Canadian national team camp.

Career 
Dubois played on boy's teams until the age of 15. In Cégep, she played for the Cégep Limoilou Titans, where she won a scholarship from the Fondation de l’athlète d’excellence du Québec for being a potential Olympic athlete.

After graduating, she studied at the Université de Montréal, playing for the school's Montreal Carabins women's ice hockey program, turning down multiple offers from NCAA programs. Across 94 U Sports games, she scored 62 points. After being hospitalised and missing parts of the 2016–17 season due to kidney failure, she planned to retire from hockey, but decided to return after the end of the summer. In February 2018, she scored the game-winning goal in overtime to send the Carabins to the provincial finals against Concordia.

She was named to the roster for the Montréal section of the PWHPA in October 2020.

International 
Dubois represented Canada at the 2012 and 2013 IIHF World Women's U18 Championship, scoring a total of 12 points in 10 games as the country won gold both times. She scored 6 points in 5 games for Canada at the 2017 Winter Universiade, winning silver.

Personal life 
She has a bachelor's degree in Arts & Sciences. Her father, Stéphane Dubois, played for the Granby Bisons in the QMJHL.

References

External links

1995 births
Living people
Canadian women's ice hockey forwards
French Quebecers
Ice hockey people from Quebec City
Montreal Carabins women's ice hockey players
Professional Women's Hockey Players Association players
Montreal Force players